Oskar Scheibel (1881–1953) was an Austrian engineer and amateur entomologist who specialized in the beetles of the Yugoslavian region and specialized in cave beetles of the family Trechinae. One of the most famous beetles that he described as new to science was the now endangered blind cave beetle that he named as Anophthalmus hitleri  after Adolf Hitler.

Biography 

Scheibel was born in Austria in 1881 and little is known of his early life but he became a railway engineer in the Austro-Hungarian region where he took an interest in cave beetles. He collected many new species and described a few himself while other entomologists named some species in his honour based on specimens that he had collected. He sold his collections of about 15000 specimens in 1921 to Germany.

He is best remembered for naming in honour of Adolf Hitler -  Anophthalmus hitleri in 1937. The beetle is now endangered and known from just five caves in Slovenia.

Part of his insect collection is now at the Natural History Museum Basel as part of the G. Frey Collection.

References 

1881 births
1953 deaths
20th-century Austrian engineers
Austrian entomologists
20th-century Austrian zoologists